Rodolphe Hottinguer may refer to:
 Baron Rodolphe Hottinguer (1835-1920)
 Baron Rodolphe Hottinguer (1902–1985), fifth baron Hottinguer
 Rodolphe Hottinger (born 1956), Swiss banker of the House of Hottinguer